The Divine and the Decay is a 1957 novel by the Welsh writer Bill Hopkins. It was republished as The Leap, in 1984. It tells the story of the leader of a British right-wing populist party who has decided to have his internal rival assassinated. To provide an alibi for himself he stays on a small Channel Island, where he becomes fascinated by a very self-possessed young woman. It was Hopkins' first and only published novel.

Plot
Peter Plowart, the leader and co-founder of the right-wing populist New Britain Party has decided to have his party co-founder assassinated due to internal conflicts. He travels to Vachau, one of the Channel Islands, to hold a speech and thus give himself an alibi while the assassination is carried out. On the island he finds a young woman whose self-possession intrigues him and makes him want to conquer her. When the woman finds out about Peter's real reason for staying on the island, she decides that he has to die. A power struggle takes place between the two.

Conception
According to Bill Hopkins' friend Colin Wilson, the book had its background in the nightly conversations the two had in Paris in 1953. Both Hopkins and Wilson admired a set of authors active around year 1900—George Bernard Shaw, H. G. Wells, G. K. Chesterton and Anatole France—and preferred these to the generations which had followed. Wilson attributed this to the atmosphere of defeat in the works of later generations; he exemplified this with the treatment of Friedrich Nietzsche in Bertrand Russell's influential A History of Western Philosophy, where Nietzsche's use of the word "will" is reduced to being associated with Nazi Germany. According to Wilson, both he and Hopkins found "will" to be "the only valid starting point for philosophy", and they both found Nietzsche's phrase about "how one becomes what one is" to be of central value.

The fictional island of Vachau is based on Sark. Hopkins visited Sark in 1956 to do research for the novel.

Publication
The book was accepted by MacGibbon & Kee at the height of the angry young men movement, which Hopkins was associated with, and published in 1957. It was republished as The Leap by Deverell & Birdsey in 1984.

Reception and legacy
The book was heavily attacked by critics upon the publication. Graham Hough of Encounter called it "an adolescent power-fantasy, extremely shoddily written", and wrote:
What is surprising, after the history of the last thirty years, is that even the naivest masturbations of the most unhappy young man should be able to take this openly Fascist form. The fact that this performance has been treated in some quarters with a moderate respect shows that there is a dangerous vacuum in our present culture that could easily be filled with highly unpleasant material; though not, I should have thought, with anything as poisonously silly as this.

According to Wilson, Hopkins remained self-confident on the surface despite the book's reception, but was shaken by what Wilson described as "character assassination", as opposed to normal literary controversy. When the typescript for Hopkins' second novel, Time and Totality, was accidentally destroyed by fire, Hopkins did not bother to rewrite it.

References

1957 British novels
British philosophical novels
English-language novels
Novels about politicians
Novels set in the Channel Islands
Novels set on fictional islands
Welsh novels
1957 debut novels
MacGibbon & Kee books